The 1874 Falkirk Burghs by-election was fought on 26 March 1874.  The byelection was fought due to the disqualification of the incumbent Liberal MP, John Ramsay, who held a government contract.  It was retained by Ramsay who was unopposed.

References

1874 in Scotland
1870s elections in Scotland
Politics of Falkirk (council area)
1874 elections in the United Kingdom
By-elections to the Parliament of the United Kingdom in Scottish constituencies
Unopposed by-elections to the Parliament of the United Kingdom in Scottish constituencies